The 23rd Annual Gotham Independent Film Awards, presented by the Independent Filmmaker Project, were held on December 2, 2013. The nominees were announced on October 24, 2013. The ceremony was hosted by Nick Kroll. It is the first Gotham Awards ceremony where the awards for best actor and best actress were given out.

Winners and nominees

Special awards

Spotlight on Women Filmmakers "Live the Dream" Grant
  Gita Pullapilly – Beneath the Harvest Sky
 Afia Nathaniel – Dukhtar
 Deb Shoval – AWOL

Gotham Tributes
 James Gandolfini
 Richard Linklater
 Katherine Oliver
 Forest Whitaker

References

External links
 

2013 film awards
2013